NSB Di 2 was a class of 54 diesel-hydraulic locomotives operated by the Norwegian State Railways (NSB). Six units were built by Maschinenbau Kiel (MaK) of Kiel, Germany, and the remaining by Thune in Oslo. The locomotives were used for shunting and for local and light freight trains throughout NSBs network.

The first six units were built by MaK and were delivered between 1954 and 1957. Thune delivered its first two units in 1958, with a MaK prime mover. Further series consisted of fifteen units in 1962, sixteen in 1963–64, nine in 1970 and six in 1973.

One unit was upgraded with a Caterpillar prime mover and a new cab in 1997, and designated Skd 225. It remained in use until 2012, while the last of the other units were retired in the 2000s. Four locomotives have been preserved at heritage railways.

History
NSB's first diesel locomotive was the Krupp-built Di 1, delivered in 1942. It had a poor operational record, being plagued with technical faults. Based on the experiences with the locomotives, NSB started in the 1950s to look into additional diesel-hydraulic locomotives for its un-electrified lines. Although satisfied with the performance, NSB felt the locomotive was too powerful and instead opted for the smaller 575C. The 575C design had been delivered with two units to the Nynäs Line in Sweden in 1951. NSB's class was designated Di 2 and the three first locomotives, numbered 801 through 803, were delivered in 1954.

The second batch of locomotives consisted of three more units built by MaK, numbered 806 through 808, and delivered in 1957. The following year NSB took delivery of two units from Thune, numbered 804 and 805. All following production would be made by Thune, with prime movers from Bergen Mekaniske Verksted. The first fifteen of these were no. 808–823, delivered in 1962, followed by sixteen units, no. 824–839, in 1963 and 1964. Another series, the nine units numbered 840–848 was delivered in 1970 and the final series, the six units numbered 849–854, was delivered in 1973.

The main task of the Di 2 was heavy shunting and short-haul freight trains. From 1960 some units were stationed in Bergen and used for shunting at Voss Station and Ål Station. Three locomotives, no. 805, 808 and 817, have been prominently featured in Olsenbanden films. Two locomotives, 827 and 829, were repainted and used for the Semsame Train in the children television series Sesam stasjon.

Retirement started during the 1990s. As of 1999 there were fifteen remaining units in use, including all of the 1973 batch, and the oldest from the 1963–64 batch. Di 2 854 was in 1997 rebuilt in the Netherlands with a new Caterpillar engine and driver's cab, receiving the new designation Skd 225. Four locomotives have been preserved by Bergen Technical Museum (817), the Norwegian Railway Club (827), the Norwegian Railway Museum (833) and the Setesdal Line (843).

Specifications

This gave 740 and 750 revolutions per minute, respectively.

Gradual changes to the design were made as production advanced. The 1962 series saw the introduction of the heavier Bergen engines and new cabs, increasing the axle load from 15 to 16.5 tonnes. The 1963–64 series saw improvements to the dead man's switch and the cooling system. The 1970 series introduced a sideways flexible mid-axle. At first the Di 2 engines were painted green, but later when NSB chose to paint its entire fleet red, the Di 2 engines were also converted to red. In the 1980s the Di 2 units were painted the distinct red and yellow shunter colors of NSB.

References

Bibliography

 

Di 2
C locomotives
Diesel locomotives of Norway
MaK locomotives
Thune locomotives
Railway locomotives introduced in 1954
1954 establishments in Norway
Standard gauge locomotives of Norway